The Kern brook lamprey (Lampetra hubbsi) is a species of lamprey in the Petromyzontidae family endemic to the United States.  It is found on the east side of San Joaquin Valley, in lower Merced, Kaweah, Kings, and San Joaquin rivers in California. It can grow to up to around 14 centimeters, and is characterized by its grayish brown and white coloring, and black spots on its fins.

Description
L. hubbsi  is similar to other lampreys in that it has a thin eel body. Some of the morphological characteristics separating L. hubbsi from other lamprey species include SO lamina 2 cusps; 4 inner laterals unicuspid; IO lamina 5 cusps; posterials about 10 (unicuspid); velar tentacles 3; reduced number of myomeres. Not much is known about the biology of these lampreys.

Classification
Lamprey taxonomy can prove to be difficult because there are few morphological differences that can be observed. L. hubbsi was originally under the subgenus Entosphenus. The genus Lampetra comprises the subgenera Entosphenus, Lethenteron, and Lampetra. Species of the Entosphenus subgenus formed a tight-knit clade that was very distinct from the other two subgenera under the genus Lampetra. However, molecular evidence helped lead to the determination that the Kern Brook Lamprey should be under the genus Lampetra instead, as Lampetra hubbsi clustered with species from the Lampetra subgenus from the west coast of North America.

Fecundity
L. hubbsi was determined to have a higher fecundity in comparison to another nonparasitic lamprey species, Eudontomyzon hellenicus, also known as the Macedonia brook lamprey, which is critically endangered. The mean absolute fecundity of L. hubbsi was twice the amount of the mean absolute fecundity of Eudontomyzon hellenicus. The absolute fecundity of the lampreys was determined by direct counting.

Threats
Some of the threats that the Kern brook lamprey faces includes the loss of habitat and being degraded by dams, channelization, and diversions. This has caused population fragmentation and these lamprey also face a narrowly restricted range, poisoning associated with fisheries management, and impacts of fish that are not native.

References

Fauna of the United States
Petromyzontidae
Taxonomy articles created by Polbot
Fish described in 1976